The 1997 Warsaw Cup by Heros was a women's tennis tournament played on outdoor clay courts at the Warszawianka Courts in Warsaw, Poland that was part of Tier III of the 1997 WTA Tour. It was the third edition of the tournament and was held from 21 July until 27 July 1997. Top-seeded Barbara Paulus won the singles title.

Finals

Singles

 Barbara Paulus defeated  Henrieta Nagyová 6–4, 6–4
 It was Paulus' only title of the year and the seventh of her career.

Doubles

 Ruxandra Dragomir /  Inés Gorrochategui defeated  Meike Babel /  Catherine Barclay 6–4, 6–0
 It was Dragomir's third title of the year and the eighth of her career. It was Gorrochategui's only title of the year and the seventh of her career.

External links
 ITF tournament edition details
 Tournament draws

Warsaw Cup by Heros
Warsaw Open
War